Amy Ruth Tan (born on February 19, 1952) is an American author known for the novel The Joy Luck Club, which was adapted into a film of the same name, as well as other novels, short story collections, and children's books.

Tan has written several other novels, including The Kitchen God's Wife, The Hundred Secret Senses, The Bonesetter's Daughter, Saving Fish from Drowning, and The Valley of Amazement. Tan's latest book is a memoir entitled Where The Past Begins: A Writer's Memoir (2017). In addition to these, Tan has written two children's books: The Moon Lady (1992) and Sagwa, the Chinese Siamese Cat (1994), which was turned into an animated series that aired on PBS.

Early life and education
Tan was born in Oakland, California. She is the second of three children born to Chinese immigrants John and Daisy Tan. Her father was an electrical engineer and Baptist minister who traveled to the United States in order to escape the chaos of the Chinese Civil War. Tan attended Marian A. Peterson High School in Sunnyvale for one year. When she was fifteen years old, her father and older brother Peter both died of brain tumors within six months of each other.

Daisy subsequently moved Amy and her younger brother, John Jr., to Switzerland, where Amy finished high school at the Institut Monte Rosa, Montreux. During this period, Amy learned about her mother's previous marriage to another man in China, of their four children (a son who died as a toddler and three daughters), and how her mother left these children behind in Shanghai. This incident was the basis for Tan's first novel The Joy Luck Club. In 1987, Amy traveled with Daisy to China, where she met her three half-sisters.

Tan had a difficult relationship with her mother. At one point, Daisy held a knife to Amy's throat and threatened to kill her while the two were arguing over Amy's new boyfriend. Her mother wanted Tan to be independent, stressing that Tan needed to make sure she was self-sufficient. Tan later found out that her mother had three abortions while in China. Daisy often threatened to kill herself, saying that she wanted to join her mother (Tan's grandmother, who died by suicide). She attempted suicide but never succeeded. Daisy died in 1999.

Tan and her mother did not speak for six months after Tan dropped out of the Baptist college her mother had selected for her, Linfield College in Oregon, to follow her boyfriend to San Jose City College in California. Tan met him on a blind date and married him in 1974. Tan later received bachelor's and master's degrees in English and linguistics from San José State University. She took doctoral courses in linguistics at University of California, Santa Cruz and University of California, Berkeley.

Career 
While in school, Tan worked odd jobs—serving as a switchboard operator, carhop, bartender, and pizza maker—before starting a writing career. As a freelance business writer, she worked on projects for AT&T, IBM, Bank of America, and Pacific Bell, writing under non-Chinese-sounding pseudonyms.

Tan began writing her first novel, The Joy Luck Club, while working as a business writer, and joined a writers' workshop, the Squaw Valley Program, to refine her draft. She submitted a part of the draft novel as a story titled 'Endgame' to the workshop. Author Molly Giles, who was teaching at the workshop, encouraged Tan to send some of her writing to magazines. Stories by Tan, drawn from the manuscript of The Joy Luck Club, were published by both FM Magazine and Seventeen, although a story was rejected by the New Yorker. Working with agent Sandra Dijkstra, Tan published several other parts of the novel as short stories, before it was sent as a draft novel manuscript. She received offers from several major publishing houses, including A.A. Knopf, Vintage, Harper & Row, Weidenfeld & Nicolson, Simon and Schuster, and Putnam Books, but declined them all as they offered compensation that she and agent considered to be insufficient. She eventually accepted a second offer from Putnam Books, for $50,000 in December 1987. The Joy Luck Club, consists of eight related stories about the experiences of four Chinese–American mother–daughter pairs.

Tan's second novel, The Kitchen God's Wife, also focuses on the relationship between an immigrant Chinese mother and her American-born daughter. Tan's third novel, The Hundred Secret Senses, was a departure from the first two novels, in focusing on the relationships between sisters, inspired partly by one of the half-siblings Tan sponsored to the United States. Tan's fourth novel, The Bonesetter's Daughter, returns to the theme of an immigrant Chinese woman and her American-born daughter.

Tan was the "lead rhythm dominatrix", backup singer and second tambourine with the Rock Bottom Remainders literary garage band. Before the band retired from touring, it had raised more than a million dollars for literacy programs. Tan appeared as herself in the third episode of Season 12 of The Simpsons, "Insane Clown Poppy."

Tan's work has been adapted into several different forms of media. The Joy Luck Club was adapted into a play in 1993; that same year, director Wayne Wang adapted the book into a film. The Bonesetter's Daughter was adapted into an opera in 2008. Tan's children's book, Sagwa, the Chinese Siamese Cat was adapted into an PBS animated television show, also named Sagwa, the Chinese Siamese Cat.

Other media
In May, 2021, the documentary, Amy Tan: Unintended Memoir was released, first on PBS, and later on Netflix.

Criticism
Tan has received criticism from some for her depiction of Chinese culture. Sau-ling Cynthia Wong, a professor at the University of California, Berkeley, wrote that Tan's novels "appear to possess the authority of authenticity but are often products of the American-born writer's own heavily mediated understanding of things Chinese". She stated that the popularity of Tan's work can mostly be attributed to Western consumers "who find her work comforting in its reproduction of stereotypical images". Author Frank Chin has said that the storylines of her novels "demonstrate a vested interest in casting Chinese men in the worst possible light".<ref name=xiaohuang>Yin, Xiao-huang (2000). "Chinese American Literature Since the 1850s. p. 235.</ref> He has accused Tan of "pandering to the popular imagination" of Westerners regarding Chinese people.

Amy Tan has dismissed these criticisms, stating that her works are not intended to be viewed as representative of general Chinese/Asian American experiences.

 Personal life 
While Tan was studying at Berkeley, her roommate was murdered and Tan had to identify the body. The incident left her temporarily mute. She said that every year for ten years, on the anniversary of the day she identified the body, she lost her voice.

In 1998, Tan contracted Lyme disease, which went misdiagnosed for a few years. As a result, she suffers complications like epileptic seizures. Tan co-founded LymeAid 4 Kids, which helps uninsured children pay for treatment. She wrote about her life with Lyme disease in The New York Times.

Tan also suffers from depression, for which she takes antidepressants. Part of the reason that Tan chose not to have children was a fear that she would pass on a genetic legacy of mental instability—her maternal grandmother died by suicide, her mother threatened suicide often, and she herself has struggled with suicidal ideation.

Tan resides near San Francisco in Sausalito, California, with her husband Lou DeMattei (whom she married in 1974), in a house they designed "to feel open and airy, like a tree house, but also to be a place where we could live comfortably into old age" with accessibility features.

Bibliography

Short stories
Mother Tongue
"Fish Cheeks" (1987)
 The Voice from the Wall
 The Rules of the Game

 Novels
 The Joy Luck Club (1989)
 The Kitchen God's Wife (1991)
 The Hundred Secret Senses (1995)
 The Bonesetter's Daughter (2001)
 Saving Fish from Drowning (2005)
 The Valley of Amazement (2013)

Children's books
 The Moon Lady, illustrated by Gretchen Schields (1992)
 Sagwa, the Chinese Siamese Cat, illustrated by Gretchen Schields (1994)

Non-fiction

 Mid-Life Confidential: The Rock Bottom Remainders Tour America With Three Chords and an Attitude (with Dave Barry, Stephen King, Tabitha King, Barbara Kingsolver) (1994)
 Mother (with Maya Angelou, Mary Higgins Clark) (1996)
 The Best American Short Stories 1999 (Editor, with Katrina Kenison) (1999)
 The Opposite of Fate: A Book of Musings (G. P. Putnam's Sons, 2003)
 Hard Listening, co-authored in July 2013, an interactive ebook about her participation in a writer/musician band, the Rock Bottom Remainders. Published by Coliloquy, LLC.
 Where the Past Begins: A Writer's Memoir, (HarperCollins Publishers, 2017)

Awards
 1989, Finalist National Book Award for The Joy Luck Club 1989, Finalist National Book Critics Circle Award for The Joy Luck Club Finalist Los Angeles Times Fiction Prize
 Bay Area Book Reviewers Award
 Commonwealth Gold Award
 American Library Association's Notable Books
 American Library Association's Best Book for Young Adults
 2005–2006, Asian/Pacific American Awards for Literature Honorable Mention for Saving Fish From Drowning The Joy Luck Club selected for the National Endowment for the Arts' Big Read
 The New York Times Notable Book
 Booklist Editors Choice
 Finalist for the Orange Prize
 Nominated for the Orange Prize
 Nominated for the International Dublin Literary Award
 Audie Award: Best Non-fiction, Abridged
 Parents' Choice Award, Best Television Program for Children
 Shortlisted British Academy of Film and Television Arts award, best screenplay adaptation
 Shortlisted WGA Award, best screenplay adaptation
 1996, Golden Plate Award of the American Academy of Achievement

See also
 Chinese American literature

References

General
 The Bonesetters Daughter-The Opera

External links

 
 'Reading in Reverse', review of The Opposite of Fate in the Oxonian Review *Teresa Miller television interview with Amy Tan (60 minutes)
 Interview with Amy Tan from the Academy of Achievement 
 
 'I Am Full Of Contradictions': Novelist Amy Tan On Fate And Family, interview on Fresh Air'' (37 minutes)

 
1952 births
Living people
20th-century American novelists
20th-century Baptists
20th-century American women writers
21st-century American novelists
21st-century Baptists
21st-century American women writers
American children's writers
American Christian writers
American novelists of Chinese descent
American people of Chinese descent
American short story writers of Chinese descent
American women essayists
American women short story writers
American women novelists
Baptists from California
Baptist writers
Christian novelists
Linfield University alumni
Postmodern writers
Rock Bottom Remainders members
San Jose City College alumni
San Jose State University alumni
Speech and language pathologists
University of California, Santa Cruz alumni
University of California, Berkeley alumni
American women children's writers
Writers from Oakland, California
21st-century American essayists
American women writers of Chinese descent